The Catholic Church in Senegal is part of the worldwide Catholic Church, under the spiritual leadership of the Pope in Rome.

There are over around 300,000 Catholics in Senegal. The country is divided into seven dioceses including one archdiocese.

 Dakar
 Kaolack
 Kolda
 Saint-Louis du Sénégal
 Tambacounda
 Thiès
 Ziguinchor

References

External links 
 Giga-Catholic Information
 Catholic Hierarchy

 
Senegal
Senegal
French West Africa